German submarine U-603  was a Type VIIC U-boat built for Nazi Germany's Kriegsmarine for service during World War II.
She was laid down on 27 February 1941 by Blohm & Voss, Hamburg as yard number 579, launched on 16 November 1941 and commissioned on 2 January 1942 under Kapitänleutnant Kurt Kölzer.

Design
German Type VIIC submarines were preceded by the shorter Type VIIB submarines. U-603 had a displacement of  when at the surface and  while submerged. She had two shafts and two  propellers.

U-603 was fitted with five  torpedo tubes (four fitted at the bow and one at the stern), fourteen torpedoes, one  SK C/35 naval gun, 220 rounds, and a  C/30 anti-aircraft gun. The boat had a complement of between forty-four and sixty.

Service history
The boat's career began with training at 5th U-boat Flotilla on 2 January 1942, followed by active service on 1 December 1942 as part of the 1st Flotilla for the remainder of her service.

On 4 December 1942 she was returning to base when she spotted a convoy and attacked by convoy escorts, but not before reporting to base and calling in support boats.

On 8 July 1943 she was attacked by a RAF Catalina with depth charges and slightly damaged.

On 13 October 1943 an Avenger from  dropped a FIDO Homing Torpedo but she successfully evaded the attack.

Convoy ON 166
U-332 hit her first with one torpedo, closely followed by two further torpedoes from U-603 which broke her back; sinking her in 15 minutes.

Two nights later she finished off the straggling Norwegian motor tanker Glittre with two torpedoes.

Convoy HX 237
Now under the command of Oberleutnant zur See Rudolf Baltz, U-603 attacked convoy HX 237 and successfully sank the Norwegian motor vessel Brand on 12 May 1943.

Wolf packs
U-603 took part in 13 wolfpacks, namely:
 Ritter (14 – 26 February 1943)
 Burggraf (4 – 5 March 1943)
 Raubgraf (7 – 20 March 1943)
 Oder (17 – 19 May 1943)
 Mosel (19 – 24 May 1943)
 Trutz (1 – 16 June 1943)
 Trutz 2 (16 – 29 June 1943)
 Geier 1 (30 June – 14 July 1943)
 Leuthen (15 – 24 September 1943)
 Rossbach (24 September – 9 October 1943)
 Igel 2 (15 – 17 February 1944)
 Hai 1 (17 – 22 February 1944)
 Preussen (22 February – 1 March 1944)

Fate
U-603 has been missing since 19 February 1944 in the North Atlantic.

Previously recorded fate
The attack was actually against a non-submarine target.

Summary of raiding history

References

Bibliography

External links

German Type VIIC submarines
1941 ships
U-boats commissioned in 1942
Ships lost with all hands
U-boats sunk in 1944
U-boats sunk by depth charges
U-boats sunk by US warships
Missing U-boats of World War II
World War II shipwrecks in the Atlantic Ocean
World War II submarines of Germany
Ships built in Hamburg
Maritime incidents in March 1944